Ali Baba International Center is located in Amman, Jordan.  The center has full accreditation from the Ministry of  Education in Jordan to teach Arabic language to speakers of other languages. The center is also approved to grant US college credit to any eligible students through Brookhaven College in the USA.  All courses are taught at Ali Baba International Center by experienced multilingual Jordanian teachers with solid teaching experience . The center offers immersion programs throughout the year. A typical program consist of a language courses, comfortable accommodation and  rich extracurricular   activities. The language courses are  supplemented by cultural and social activities, and guided-tours to the major tourist attractions  of Jordan. Participants in the programs will also be encouraged to meet and interact with people everywhere, immersing them in the every fabric of  the Jordanian society, gaining for themselves an insider's view of Jordanians lives.

Arabic Programs Description
Programs Types Ali Baba International Center  offers two types of programs: regular programs and special  programs. A short description of each program is given in what follows.

I . Regular programs are offered throughout the year. Two types of regular  programs are offered; 1-month group programs, and private programs.  A 1-month group program is a package consisting of the followings: a 1-month long intensive Arabic language course,  a comfortable accommodation, airport pickup, and  an optional tour  to a touristic site in Jordan. In the a 1-month group program a student takes 80 hours of Arabic language instruction; 5 times a week, 4-hours each time, for a period of 4 weeks. The 80-hour program is equal to a 4-credit course in most universities. Students wishing to study for longer periods can  cover consecutive levels of Arabic. Private regular programs are offered anytime of the year. These programs are more flexible since students can take as many hours as they wish and for the duration they need. For both types of regular programs students may request the type of Arabic language they wish to learn; MSA (Modern Standard Arabic), Media Arabic, or Colloquial Arabic. Elementary, intermediate and advanced  classes are opened in each month to meet the demands of people having different backgrounds in Arabic.  A placement test will be given to the registered students before the start of the course  to determine the level and accordingly the appropriate class they should enroll in.

II. Special Programs: a special  program is a package consisting of a specialized  course in Arabic or a middle eastern or Islamic field,  accommodation, and  tours around Jordan if desired. The specialized courses are tailored to meet the needs of individuals or groups working in fields like diplomacy, business, culture and others,  and therefore may vary in their contents, durations,  time of offering, and cost. The following possible special courses can be offered:

Special Arabic Courses : individuals or groups may request specialized Arabic courses in certain fields such diplomacy and  political science, economics and business, sports or other professional fields.
Academic Courses:   university students may request  undergraduate level courses in Archaeology, Islamic Culture, Arabic Culture or Middle Eastern Studies. Courses will be taught in English at the center. Of courses, Arabic language may be  offered   with the courses, if requested.

German Courses Description

Ali Baba International Center offers two types of programs: regular group programs and individual programs. A short description of each program is given in what follows.

Regular programs are offered throughout the year (from January to December).

Our courses are intensive (16 teaching units weekly, each unit 45 minutes), semi-intensive (12 teaching units weekly) and extensive (9 teaching units weekly) for a period of 4 to 6 weeks.  In the group program a student takes 48-60 teaching units of German language instruction for each level.

A placement test will be given to the registered students before the start of the course  to determine the level and accordingly the appropriate class they should enroll in.

Individual programs are offered throughout the year (from January to December).

Our individual courses are tailored to meet the needs of individuals or small groups working in fields like medicine, diplomacy, business, and others, and therefore may vary in their contents, durations, time of offering, and cost.

The center cooperates with the Goethe Institute in Amman. All courses are taught at Ali Baba International Center. Experienced multilingual German, Austrian and Jordanian instructors with solid teaching experience and training will be responsible for teaching  the  German courses. The language courses are  supplemented by cultural and social activities. Participants in the programs will also be encouraged to meet and interact with German speaking people in Jordan and everywhere.

References

External links
 Official website

Buildings and structures in Amman
Education in Amman
Educational organisations based in Jordan